Alexander Johnson or Alex Johnson may refer to:

Alexander Bryan Johnson (1786–1867), British philosopher and banker
Alexander Lange Johnson (1910–1989), Norwegian bishop
Alexander S. Johnson (1817–1878), American jurist
Alexander Johnson (basketball) (born 1983), American basketball player
Alexander Johnson (figure skater) (born 1990), American figure skater
Alexander Johnson (mathematician) (1830–1912), Canadian academic
Alexander Johnson (pentathlete) (born 1969), Australian modern pentathlete
Alexander D. Johnson, American biochemist
Alexander Johnson, lead singer of These Kids Wear Crowns
Alex Johnson (1942–2015), American baseball player
Alex Johnson (Australian footballer) (born 1992), Australian rules footballer
Alex Johnson (basketball) (born 1988), Canadian basketball player
Alex Johnson (climber) (born 1989), American rock climber
Alex Johnson (footballer, born 1917) (1917–1944), English footballer
A. J. Johnson (linebacker), American football player
Alex Johnson (firefighter), British firefighter
Alex T. Johnson, first African-American chief of staff of the U.S. Helsinki Commission 
Boris Johnson (Alexander Boris de Pfeffel Johnson, born 1964), British politician and ex-Prime Minister of the United Kingdom

See also
Alexander Johnston (disambiguation), several people
Alexandra Johnson (disambiguation), multiple people
Alexz Johnson (born 1986), Canadian singer and actor
Hotel Alex Johnson, in Rapid City, South Dakota